Martin Hunal (born 8 September 1989) is a Czech former professional cyclist, who rode professionally for the  and  teams between 2011 and 2017.

Major results

2011
 3rd Ronde van Overijssel
 8th Overall Course de la Solidarité Olympique
2012
 3rd Overall An Post Rás
 5th Tour Bohemia
2013
 1st  Mountains classification Okolo Jižních Čech
 7th Overall An Post Rás
1st Mountains classification
 7th Tour Bohemia
2014
 4th Visegrad 4 Bicycle Race – GP Czech Republic
 5th Visegrad 4 Bicycle Race – GP Slovakia
 7th Grand Prix Královéhradeckého kraje
 8th Overall Course de la Solidarité Olympique
2015
 7th Visegrad 4 Bicycle Race – GP Czech Republic
2016
 3rd Road race, National Road Championships
 3rd Memoriał Romana Siemińskiego
 8th Overall Dookoła Mazowsza
2017
 1st Stage 1 (TTT) Czech Cycling Tour

References

External links

1989 births
Living people
People from Pelhřimov District
Czech male cyclists
Sportspeople from the Vysočina Region